The Advanced Combat Helmet (ACH) is the United States Army's current combat helmet, used since the early 2000s. It was developed by the United States Army Soldier Systems Center, the U.S. Army Special Operations Command, and the U.S. Army Research Laboratory to be the next generation of protective combat helmets for use by the American ground forces. The ACH is derived from the Modular Integrated Communications Helmet. 

The ACH is currently in the process of being phased out and replaced by the Enhanced Combat Helmet (ECH), an improvement upon the ACH derived from its design; however, both the ACH and the newer ECH are being replaced by the Integrated Head Protection System.

History

2000s
The Advanced Combat Helmet was first fielded beginning in 2003 in limited numbers to eventually replace the PASGT helmet. In 2006, 102,000 helmets were ordered from ArmorSource, of which 99,000 were delivered when the contract was fulfilled and properly closed. In 2007, the Army introduced a ballistic "nape pad" that attaches to the ACH's rear suspension system. Of these, 430,000 were to be issued in the Rapid Fielding Initiative (RFI). Beginning in 2008, the Army's Program Executive Office Soldier outfitted soldiers of the 101st Airborne Division and 4th Infantry Division bound for Iraq with helmet-mounted sensors designed to gather data on head injuries (or traumatic brain injuries) caused during IED detonations. The data collected will help with the design of improvements to the ACH's suspension and chin strap systems. In May 2009, 55,000 of these were in storage and 44,000 were in use by U.S. Army, Navy, and Air Force personnel. The 44,000 helmets in use by service members were recalled by the U.S. Army in May 2010 due to potentially defective materials being used. No proof of defective materials was ever established nor evidence of any wrongdoing by the contractor. 

In May 2009, 34,218 ACHs made by the Gentex Corporation were recalled. Certain screws attaching the chinstrap and other parts to the helmet did not conform to specifications in the contract. The screws failed ballistics tests at extreme temperatures. Gentex alleges its subcontractor had fabricated compliance certificates for the screws. A MultiCam cover for the Advanced Combat Helmet began fielding in late 2009 for soldiers deployed in Afghanistan.

2010s
On March 7, 2016, Armorsource LLC agreed to pay $3 million to settle False Claims Act allegations. Revision was awarded a contract for the ACH II contract. The ACH and Lightweight Helmets will eventually be replaced by the Enhanced Combat Helmet and Integrated Head Protection System.

Design 
The shape of the ACH is virtually identical to the MICH TC-2000. Compared to the PASGT helmet, the front brow is eliminated to improve upwards visibility and allow easier mounting of night-vision goggle brackets. The side brim has been raised to the point that the entire lower brim of the helmet is "flat" compared to the PASGT which curves upwards at the back. This is to allow greater compatibility with communications headsets and improve hearing when headsets are not used. 

The ACH uses ballistic fiber such as kevlar and twaron. In 2007, the Army developed and introduced a ballistic "nape pad" that attaches to the ACH's rear suspension system and coincided with the introduction of the Improved Outer Tactical Vest (IOTV). 

The pad reduces soldier deaths from fragmentation wounds to the neck and lower head.

Lightweight Advanced Combat Helmet
The Lightweight Advanced Combat Helmet Generation II (LW-ACH Gen II) weighs one pound less than the original ACH while offering the same ballistic protection. This is being used for the basis of the Lightweight Helmet.

Users 

 : The Australian Enhanced Combat Helmet is an ACH variant made by Rabintex, Israel used by all branches of Australian Defence Force and Specialist Response Group of the Australian Federal Police, replaced by the Tiered Combat Helmet.
 : Used by Iraqi commandos.
 : Rabintex 303 AU variant used by Irish Defence Force.
 : In use by YAMAM.
 : Used by the Mexican Army and SEDENA and SEMAR Special Operations Forces.
 : Australian Enhanced Combat Helmet made by Rabintex, Israel used by all branches of New Zealand Defence Force and Special Tactics Group of the New Zealand Police from 2009-2019.
 : ACH helmets made by Eurokompozit used by the Macedonian Police's Special Task Unit "Tigers" and Special Operations Regiment (North Macedonia).
 : ACH worn by KATUSA units.
 : Used by the U.S. Army.

Notes

References

External links

 Official ACH webpage from Gentex 

2000s fashion
2010s fashion
Combat helmets of the United States
United States Army equipment
Military equipment introduced in the 2000s